The Magical Moment is a TweetBook by Brazilian author Paulo Coelho. The book contains the core of the author's wisdom accumulated throughout all those years in Twitter. Illustrated by Joong Hwan Hwang, it was originally published in Korea. Lines of wisdom that fascinated followers around the world.

About the Author 
Paulo Coelho is a Brazilian novelist. He is one of the most widely read authors in the world today.
His books have sold more than 145 million copies worldwide, which have been released in 170 countries and translated into over 80 languages. Born in Rio de Janeiro (Brazil) in 1947, Paulo Coelho is the author of some of the most read titles of our time, such as The Pilgrimage or The Alchemist, the book which made him internationally famous. But also, Paulo Coelho has written many other books which have touched the hearts of people around the world, among them Veronika Decides to Die, Eleven Minutes, The Zahir, Aleph and Manuscript Found in Accra.

He has been a member of the Academy of Letters of Brazil since 2002, and named a Messenger of Peace by the United Nations since 2007. In 2009 he received the Guinness World Record for the most translated author for the same book (The Alchemist). He is also the writer with the highest number of social media followers social media (more than 20 million).

Illustrator 
Joong Hwan Hwang graduated from Seoul's Hongik University with Bachelor's degrees and Master's degrees. He then went on to work as a graphic designer and multimedia producer in well-established advertising company, Kum-Kand. By chance his cartoon 386c was published in a daily newspaper, and after that he started his career as a cartoonist.

He has worked as a journalist in the Dong-A daily newspaper for 13 years and his cartoon 386c was loved by readers. He has also drawn cartoons for more than 100 major media publications such as 'The Weekly Hankook', 'The Educator's' newspaper and 'The Science'. It's worth noting that Joong Hwan Hwang has also illustrated many books. Currently he is Professor of Cartoon and Animation Arts at the Cho Sun University, where he teaches cartoon drawing and illustration.

References 

Books by Paulo Coelho
2013 non-fiction books
Twitter
Korean-language works